Mayday Parade, an American rock band have released seven studio albums, three extended plays, and 29 singles. The group has also made 27 music videos of their songs. As of July 2013, the band has sold 600,000 copies of their albums and 3,000,000 copies of their songs. The group's debut album, A Lesson in Romantics released on July 10, 2007, and a track from that album, "Miserable at Best", have been certified Gold by the RIAA. Their second studio album, Anywhere but Here was released on October 6, 2009 and peaked at number 31 on the US Billboard 200. Their self-titled third studio album was released on October 4, 2011. They released a cover of "Somebody That I Used to Know" in 2012 and the song peaked at number 19 on the US Heatseekers Songs chart.

Their fourth studio album, Monsters in the Closet was released on October 8, 2013 and peaked at number ten on the Billboard 200. The single "Ghosts" managed to chart on the US Hot Rock & Alternative Songs at number 46. The groups fifth studio album, Black Lines was released on October 9, 2015. Their sixth studio album, Sunnyland was released on June 15, 2018. Their seventh studio album, What It Means To Fall Apart was released on November 19, 2021.

Studio albums

Extended plays

Singles

Other charted songs

Music videos

Original multi-artist compilation appearances

Punk Goes Acoustic 2 with "Three Cheers for Five Years" (acoustic)
Punk Goes Pop 2 with "When I Grow Up" (Pussycat Dolls cover)
Punk Goes Classic Rock with "We Are the Champions" (Queen cover)
Punk Goes Pop 3 with "In My Head" (Jason Derülo cover)
Take Action! Vol. 9 with "The Silence" (Hurley Studio acoustic)
Punk Goes Pop 5 with "Somebody That I Used to Know" feat. Vic Fuentes (Gotye cover)
Punk Goes 90's 2 with "Comedown" (Bush cover)

Notes

See also
List of songs recorded by Mayday Parade

References
 Footnotes

 Citations

Discographies of American artists
Pop punk group discographies